Sophronia is a genus of moths in the family Gelechiidae.

Species
 Sophronia acaudella Rebel, 1903
 Sophronia alaicella Caradja, 1920
 Sophronia albomarginata Li & Zheng, 1998
 Sophronia aquilex Meyrick, 1926
 Sophronia ascalis Gozmány, 1951
 Sophronia catharurga Meyrick, 1923
 Sophronia chilonella (Treitschke, 1833)
 Sophronia consanguinella Herrich-Schäffer, 1854
 Sophronia curonella Standfuss, 1884
 Sophronia finitimella Rebel, 1905
 Sophronia gelidella Nordmann, 1941
 Sophronia grandii Hering, 1933
 Sophronia humerella (Denis & Schiffermüller, 1775)
 Sophronia illustrella (Hübner, 1796)
 Sophronia marginella Toll, 1936
 Sophronia mediatrix Zeller, 1877
 Sophronia orientalis Li & Zheng, 1998
 Sophronia parahumerella Amsel, 1935
 Sophronia primella  Busck, 1907
 Sophronia roseicrinella Busck, 1909
 Sophronia sagittans Meyrick, 1923
 Sophronia santolinae Staudinger, 1863
 Sophronia semicostella (Hübner, [1813])
 Sophronia sicariellus (Zeller, 1839)
 Sophronia teretracma Meyrick, 1927

References

 
Gelechiini